Ademir Roque Kaefer (born 6 January 1960 in Toledo, Paraná), known as just Ademir, is a Brazilian former footballer who played as a midfielder.

In his career (1978–1995) he played for SC Internacional, Toledo, Racing Club (Argentina), Matsubara, Santo André and Cruzeiro. He won four Campeonato Gaúcho (1981, 1982, 1983, 1984), three Campeonato Mineiro (1987, 1990, 1994), one Brazilian Cup (1993) and one Supercopa Sudamericana (1991).

With the Brazilian Olympic Team he won silver medal at the 1984 Summer Olympics, and with the senior Brazil team played seven matches in 1988. In same he year was in the squad for the 1988 Summer Olympics, and won another silver medal.  He never played in the FIFA World Cup, and retired after a 16-year career.

References

1960 births
Living people
Brazilian footballers
Brazilian expatriate footballers
Brazil international footballers
Campeonato Brasileiro Série A players
Argentine Primera División players
Expatriate footballers in Argentina
Footballers at the 1984 Summer Olympics
Footballers at the 1988 Summer Olympics
Olympic footballers of Brazil
Olympic silver medalists for Brazil
Brazilian people of German descent
Olympic medalists in football
People from Toledo, Paraná
Pan American Games gold medalists for Brazil
Medalists at the 1988 Summer Olympics
Medalists at the 1984 Summer Olympics
Association football midfielders
Pan American Games medalists in football
Toledo Esporte Clube players
Sport Club Internacional players
Esporte Clube Santo André players
Cruzeiro Esporte Clube players
Racing Club de Avellaneda footballers
Footballers at the 1987 Pan American Games
Medalists at the 1987 Pan American Games
Sportspeople from Paraná (state)